The Modern Sound of Betty Carter is a 1960 (see 1960 in music) album by Betty Carter.

The album has been available since 1992 on CD format as I Can't Help It on GRP Records' Impulse! label series (ASIN no. B000003N6D). (This CD includes songs from the 1958 Peacock LP Out There.)

Track listing 
 "What a Little Moonlight Can Do" (Harry M. Woods) – 2:06
 "There's No You" (Tom Adair, George Durgom, Hal Hopper) – 3:11
 "I Don't Want to Set the World on Fire" (Bennie Benjamin, Eddie Durham, Sol Marcus, Eddie Seiler) – 2:24
 "Remember" (Irving Berlin) – 2:24
 "My Reverie" (Larry Clinton) – 2:50
 "Mean to Me" (Fred E. Ahlert, Roy Turk) – 2:06
 "Don't Weep for the Lady" (Darshan Singh) – 3:02
 "Jazz (Ain't Nothin' But Soul)" (Norman Mapp)  – 1:58
 "For You" (Joe Burke, Al Dubin) – 2:21
 "Stormy Weather" (Harold Arlen, Ted Koehler) – 3:24
 "At Sundown" (Walter Donaldson) – 2:44
 "On the Alamo" (Isham Jones, Gus Kahn) – 1:56

Personnel 
Recorded August 18–30, 1960, New York City, New York, USA:

 Betty Carter - vocals
 Richard Wess - arranger, conductor

References 

1960 albums
Betty Carter albums
ABC Records albums